Brett Patrick Dalton (born January 7, 1983) is an American actor. He is best known for playing Grant Ward and Hive in ABC's series Agents of S.H.I.E.L.D., as well as Michael Munroe in the 2015 video game Until Dawn.

Early life
Dalton graduated in 2001 from Westmont High School in Campbell, California, where he became interested in acting after auditioning for a production of One Flew Over the Cuckoo's Nest and where he was California Scholarship Federation president and associated student body president. He played the lead in My Favorite Year. After studying at University of California, Berkeley for his undergraduate degree, Dalton received a Master of Fine Arts from the Yale School of Drama in 2011. One of his Yale classmates was Oscar winner Lupita Nyong'o.

Career
In November 2012, he was cast in a starring role in the Joss Whedon TV series Agents of S.H.I.E.L.D as Agent Grant Ward and Hive. The series follows character Phil Coulson and his small team of agents, Dalton's character among them. Dalton's other television credits include Blue Bloods, Army Wives, and National Geographic Channel's Killing Lincoln, a Tony and Ridley Scott Production. His theatre credits include Passion Play, Romeo and Juliet, and Happy Now? (Yale Repertory); Sweet Bird of Youth and Demon Dreams (Williamstown Theatre Festival); Macbeth (Macbeth) You Can't Take It With You (Chautauqua Theater Company), and The Understudy (Westport Country Playhouse).

On May 16, 2014, Dalton was cast in indie drama film Lost in Florence as Eric Lombard, a heartbroken former college football star who gets in over his head with a dangerous Florentine sport and alluring local woman, alongside Stana Katic and Emily Atack.

In 2015, Dalton voiced the character Mike in Until Dawn (2015), an action survival horror video game developed by Supermassive Games and published by Sony Computer Entertainment for the PlayStation 4. In February, Dalton was nominated by the National Academy of Video Game Trade Reviewers for his performance.

Dalton stars in The Resurrection of Gavin Stone, a film released on January 20, 2017, by Walden Media and Vertical Church Films.

In 2021, Dalton was cast in a recurring role in NBC drama series Chicago Fire as Interim Lieutenant Jason Pelham.

Personal life
Brett lived in Los Angeles with his wife Melissa Trn and their daughter, who was born in 2012. He filed for divorce in November 2019.

Filmography

References

External links

 
 

1983 births
Living people
American male film actors
American male television actors
American male video game actors
American male voice actors
Male actors from San Jose, California
University of California, Berkeley alumni
Yale School of Drama alumni
21st-century American male actors